Paul Steven Diamond (born January 2, 1953) is a United States district judge of the United States District Court for the Eastern District of Pennsylvania and a former federal judicial nominee to be a judge on the United States Court of Appeals for the Third Circuit. He was appointed a federal judge by George W. Bush in 2004.

Education
Born in Brooklyn, New York, Diamond received a Bachelor of Arts degree from Columbia University in 1974 and a Juris Doctor from the University of Pennsylvania Law School in 1977.

Career

Diamond was an assistant district attorney in the Philadelphia District Attorney's Office from 1977–1979. In 1980 he served as a law clerk to Pennsylvania Supreme Court Justice Bruce W. Kauffman, who would later also be appointed as a judge on the Eastern District by President Bill Clinton). Diamond returned to the District Attorney's Office from 1981 to 1983. He worked in private practice in Philadelphia from 1983 to 2004, when he was appointed by President George W. Bush to the Eastern District. Diamond also has worked as an adjunct professor of law at Temple University Beasley School of Law from 1990–1992. From 1993 until 1995, Diamond worked as the treasurer and as the counsel for the failed 1996 presidential campaign of United States Senator Arlen Specter.

District court service

On January 20, 2004, President George W. Bush nominated Diamond to a seat on the United States District Court for the Eastern District of Pennsylvania vacated by Herbert J. Hutton. Diamond was confirmed by the United States Senate on June 16, 2004 by a vote of 97-0, and received his commission on June 22, 2004.

Third Circuit nomination under Bush

On July 2, 2008, the Legal Intelligencer reported that as part of a package of judicial nominees, President Bush had agreed to withdraw his then nominee to the U.S. Court of Appeals for the Third Circuit, Gene E. K. Pratter and replace her with Diamond. On July 24, 2008, President Bush formally nominated Diamond to the United States Court of Appeals for the Third Circuit, in conjunction with Pratter's withdrawal. Since Diamond was nominated after July 1, 2008, the unofficial start date of the Thurmond Rule during a presidential election year, no hearings were scheduled on his nomination, and the nomination was returned to Bush at the end of his term.

Presidential election cases 
In 2016, Judge Diamond rejected Jill Stein's request for a recount of Donald Trump's victory in Pennsylvania.

During the 2020 presidential election, Judge Diamond heard arguments from the Trump campaign who were seeking to stop Philadelphia's election board from counting remaining ballots. He advised the two parties to reach an agreement and he then dismissed the case without prejudice.

References

Sources

1953 births
Living people
Columbia College (New York) alumni
University of Pennsylvania Law School alumni
Judges of the United States District Court for the Eastern District of Pennsylvania
United States district court judges appointed by George W. Bush
21st-century American judges
People from Brooklyn
Temple University faculty